Jan Mehlum (born 1 January 1945) is a Norwegian crime fiction writer and sociologist. He made his literary debut in 1996 with Gylne tider.  He was awarded the Riverton Prize in 1998 for Kalde hender.

References

1945 births
Writers from Tønsberg
Norwegian crime fiction writers
Norwegian male novelists
Living people